Oberwölz is a city since 2015 in the Murau District of Styria, Austria.  The city was founded as part of the Styria municipal structural reform,
at the end of 2014, with the merger of the former independent municipalities Oberwölz Stadt, Oberwölz Umgebung, Schönberg-Lachtal and Winklern bei Oberwölz, whereby the new municipality became ranked as a city ("Stadtgemeinde").

Geography

Municipality arrangement 
The city territory includes the following eleven sections (populations as of 1 Jan 2015):

 Eselsberg (138)
 Hinterburg (120)
 Krumegg (56)
 Mainhartsdorf (374)
 Oberwölz (Stadt) (374)
 Raiming (306)
 Salchau (180)
 Schönberg-Lachtal (418)
 Schöttl (104)
 Vorstadt (603)
 Winklern bei Oberwölz (334).

The municipality consists of the Katastralgemeinden Hinterburg, Oberwölz, Raiming, Salchau, Schönberg, Schöttl and Winklern.

Culture and sights

Overall 
 Sagenweg Sagenhaftes Wölzertal
 Heimatmuseum
 Blasmusikmuseum

Oberwölz Stadt 
 Hauptplatz: from the Middle Ages
 Stadtmauer und Wehrtürme: the city walls, three city gates, and the defense towers are constructed
 Spitalskirche church (Filialkirche hl. Sigismund beim Spital): built under Bishop Nikodemus della Scala (1421–1443). The inscription, under the master builder bust, reads with the name "Hans Jersleben". After the fire of 1480, there was renovation of the vaulted ceiling and tracery windows. Remarkable stonework at the gallery until 1500.

Oberwölz Umgebung 
 Fischsee-Wasserfall, waterfall from the Fischsee lake in the Kar der Schöttl Alm
 Glattjochkapelle chapel
 Eselsberger Alm
 Rastplatz der Gemeinde Oberwölz Umgebung: In the year 2006, it was built near the Lindwurm-Station of the Rundwanderweges Sagenhaftes Wölzertal.  The granite blocks of the Rastplatz (see photo) symbolize 4 Katastralgemeinden (Salchau, Schöttl, Raiming and Hinterburg), the flying water indicates their union.

Sports and pastimes 
 Outdoor swimming pool with water slide, sports pool, children's pool, diving tower
 4 Tennis courts
 2 football pitches
 Skatepark
 Asphaltstockbahn
 Fitness course
 High ropes course
 Cross country ski trail
 Wintersports in ski area of Lachtal

References

External links 
 Webseite der Gemeinde Oberwölz

 
 Webseite des Skigebiets Lachtal

Cities and towns in Murau District